Semyonovsky (masculine), Semyonovskaya (feminine), or Semyonovskoye (neuter) is the name of several rural localities in Russia.

Republic of Bashkortostan
As of 2010, one rural locality in the Republic of Bashkortostan bears this name:
Semyonovskoye, Republic of Bashkortostan, a selo in Semyonovsky Selsoviet of Baymaksky District

Bryansk Oblast
As of 2010, one rural locality in Bryansk Oblast bears this name:
Semyonovsky, Bryansk Oblast, a settlement in Supryaginsky Selsoviet of Pochepsky District

Chuvash Republic
As of 2010, one rural locality in the Chuvash Republic bears this name:
Semyonovskoye, Chuvash Republic, a selo in Semyonovskoye Rural Settlement of Poretsky District

Irkutsk Oblast
As of 2010, one rural locality in Irkutsk Oblast bears this name:
Semyonovskoye, Irkutsk Oblast, a selo in Zalarinsky District

Ivanovo Oblast
As of 2010, four rural localities in Ivanovo Oblast bear this name:
Semyonovskoye, Ilyinsky District, Ivanovo Oblast, a village in Ilyinsky District
Semyonovskoye, Ivanovsky District, Ivanovo Oblast, a selo in Ivanovsky District
Semyonovskoye, Vichugsky District, Ivanovo Oblast, a selo in Vichugsky District
Semyonovskoye, Zavolzhsky District, Ivanovo Oblast, a selo in Zavolzhsky District

Kaluga Oblast
As of 2010, five rural localities in Kaluga Oblast bear this name:
Semyonovsky, Kaluga Oblast, a settlement in Khvastovichsky District
Semyonovskoye (Orekhovnya Rural Settlement), Iznoskovsky District, Kaluga Oblast, a village in Iznoskovsky District; municipally, a part of Orekhovnya Rural Settlement of that district
Semyonovskoye (Izvolsk Rural Settlement), Iznoskovsky District, Kaluga Oblast, a village in Iznoskovsky District; municipally, a part of Izvolsk Rural Settlement of that district
Semyonovskoye (Khvoshchi Rural Settlement), Iznoskovsky District, Kaluga Oblast, a village in Iznoskovsky District; municipally, a part of Khvoshchi Rural Settlement of that district
Semyonovskoye, Zhukovsky District, Kaluga Oblast, a village in Zhukovsky District

Kemerovo Oblast
As of 2010, one rural locality in Kemerovo Oblast bears this name:
Semyonovsky, Kemerovo Oblast, a settlement in Zvezdnaya Rural Territory of Kemerovsky District

Kirov Oblast
As of 2010, three rural localities in Kirov Oblast bear this name:
Semyonovsky, Kirov Oblast, a railway crossing loop under the administrative jurisdiction of  the urban-type settlement of Leninskoye, Shabalinsky District
Semyonovskoye, Kirov Oblast, a selo under the administrative jurisdiction of  the urban-type settlement of Leninskoye, Shabalinsky District
Semyonovskaya, Kirov Oblast, a village under the administrative jurisdiction of the urban-type settlement of Lalsk, Luzsky District

Kostroma Oblast
As of 2010, four rural localities in Kostroma Oblast bear this name:
Semyonovskoye, Buysky District, Kostroma Oblast, a village in Tsentralnoye Settlement of Buysky District
Semyonovskoye, Galichsky District, Kostroma Oblast, a village in Stepanovskoye Settlement of Galichsky District
Semyonovskoye, Nerekhtsky District, Kostroma Oblast, a selo in Prigorodnoye Settlement of Nerekhtsky District
Semyonovskoye, Sudislavsky District, Kostroma Oblast, a village in Raslovskoye Settlement of Sudislavsky District

Kursk Oblast
As of 2010, two rural localities in Kursk Oblast bear this name:
Semyonovsky, Fatezhsky District, Kursk Oblast, a khutor in Kolychevsky Selsoviet of Fatezhsky District
Semyonovsky, Kastorensky District, Kursk Oblast, a settlement in Tsvetochensky Selsoviet of Kastorensky District

Moscow Oblast
As of 2010, fourteen rural localities in Moscow Oblast bear this name:
Semyonovskoye, Dmitrovsky District, Moscow Oblast, a selo in Sinkovskoye Rural Settlement of Dmitrovsky District
Semyonovskoye, Biorkovskoye Rural Settlement, Kolomensky District, Moscow Oblast, a village in Biorkovskoye Rural Settlement of Kolomensky District
Semyonovskoye, Nepetsinskoye Rural Settlement, Kolomensky District, Moscow Oblast, a village in Nepetsinskoye Rural Settlement of Kolomensky District
Semyonovskoye, Borodinskoye Rural Settlement, Mozhaysky District, Moscow Oblast, a village in Borodinskoye Rural Settlement of Mozhaysky District, Moscow Oblast
Semyonovskoye, Zamoshinskoye Rural Settlement, Mozhaysky District, Moscow Oblast, a selo in Zamoshinskoye Rural Settlement of Mozhaysky District
Semyonovskoye, Pushkinsky District, Moscow Oblast, a selo in Yeldiginskoye Rural Settlement of Pushkinsky District
Semyonovskoye, Ramensky District, Moscow Oblast, a village in Nikonovskoye Rural Settlement of Ramensky District
Semyonovskoye, Serpukhovsky District, Moscow Oblast, a village in Lipitskoye Rural Settlement of Serpukhovsky District
Semyonovskoye, Stupinsky District, Moscow Oblast, a selo in Semyonovskoye Rural Settlement of Stupinsky District
Semyonovskoye, Taldomsky District, Moscow Oblast, a village in Guslevskoye Rural Settlement of Taldomsky District
Semyonovskaya, Krivandinskoye Rural Settlement, Shatursky District, Moscow Oblast, a village in Krivandinskoye Rural Settlement of Shatursky District
Semyonovskaya, Pyshlitskoye Rural Settlement, Shatursky District, Moscow Oblast, a village in Pyshlitskoye Rural Settlement of Shatursky District
Semyonovskaya, Misheronsky Work Settlement, Shatursky District, Moscow Oblast, a village under the administrative jurisdiction of  the work settlement of Misheronsky, Shatursky District
Semyonovskaya, Yegoryevsky District, Moscow Oblast, a village under the administrative jurisdiction of the town of Yegoryevsk, Yegoryevsky District

Novgorod Oblast
As of 2010, one rural locality in Novgorod Oblast bears this name:
Semyonovskoye, Novgorod Oblast, a village in Volokskoye Settlement of Borovichsky District

Novosibirsk Oblast
As of 2010, three rural localities in Novosibirsk Oblast bear this name:
Semyonovsky, Cherepanovsky District, Novosibirsk Oblast, a settlement in Cherepanovsky District
Semyonovsky, Kochenyovsky District, Novosibirsk Oblast, a settlement in Kochenyovsky District
Semyonovsky, Toguchinsky District, Novosibirsk Oblast, a settlement in Toguchinsky District

Oryol Oblast
As of 2010, one rural locality in Oryol Oblast bears this name:
Semyonovsky, Oryol Oblast, a settlement in Stolbishchensky Selsoviet of Dmitrovsky District

Smolensk Oblast
As of 2010, five rural localities in Smolensk Oblast bear this name:
Semyonovskoye, Kardymovsky District, Smolensk Oblast, a village in Berezkinskoye Rural Settlement of Kardymovsky District
Semyonovskoye, Tyomkinsky District, Smolensk Oblast, a village in Medvedevskoye Rural Settlement of Tyomkinsky District
Semyonovskoye, Khmelitskoye Rural Settlement, Vyazemsky District, Smolensk Oblast, a village in Khmelitskoye Rural Settlement of Vyazemsky District
Semyonovskoye, Rossiyskoye Rural Settlement, Vyazemsky District, Smolensk Oblast, a village in Rossiyskoye Rural Settlement of Vyazemsky District
Semyonovskaya, Smolensk Oblast, a village in Vasilyevskoye Rural Settlement of Tyomkinsky District

Tambov Oblast
As of 2010, one rural locality in Tambov Oblast bears this name:
Semyonovsky, Tambov Oblast, a settlement in Kamensky Selsoviet of Rzhaksinsky District

Tver Oblast
As of 2010, twelve rural localities in Tver Oblast bear this name:
Semyonovskoye, Kalininsky District, Tver Oblast, a village in Kalininsky District
Semyonovskoye (Pisyakovskoye Rural Settlement), Kashinsky District, Tver Oblast, a village in Kashinsky District; municipally, a part of Pisyakovskoye Rural Settlement of that district
Semyonovskoye (Bulatovskoye Rural Settlement), Kashinsky District, Tver Oblast, a village in Kashinsky District; municipally, a part of Bulatovskoye Rural Settlement of that district
Semyonovskoye, Kesovogorsky District, Tver Oblast, a village in Kesovogorsky District
Semyonovskoye, Krasnokholmsky District, Tver Oblast, a village in Krasnokholmsky District
Semyonovskoye, Maksatikhinsky District, Tver Oblast, a khutor in Maksatikhinsky District
Semyonovskoye, Nelidovsky District, Tver Oblast, a village in Nelidovsky District
Semyonovskoye (Itomlya Rural Settlement), Rzhevsky District, Tver Oblast, a village in Rzhevsky District; municipally, a part of Itomlya Rural Settlement of that district
Semyonovskoye (Pobeda Rural Settlement), Rzhevsky District, Tver Oblast, a village in Rzhevsky District; municipally, a part of Pobeda Rural Settlement of that district
Semyonovskoye, Torzhoksky District, Tver Oblast, a village in Torzhoksky District
Semyonovskoye, Zapadnodvinsky District, Tver Oblast, a village in Zapadnodvinsky District
Semyonovskoye, Zubtsovsky District, Tver Oblast, a village in Zubtsovsky District

Udmurt Republic
As of 2010, one rural locality in the Udmurt Republic bears this name:
Semyonovsky, Udmurt Republic, a village in Kachkashursky Selsoviet of Glazovsky District

Vladimir Oblast
As of 2010, two rural localities in Vladimir Oblast bear this name:
Semyonovskoye, Kirzhachsky District, Vladimir Oblast, a selo in Kirzhachsky District
Semyonovskoye, Sobinsky District, Vladimir Oblast, a selo in Sobinsky District

Vologda Oblast
As of 2010, twenty-one rural localities in Vologda Oblast bear this name:
Semyonovskoye, Gryazovetsky District, Vologda Oblast, a village in Ploskovsky Selsoviet of Gryazovetsky District
Semyonovskoye, Mezhdurechensky District, Vologda Oblast, a village in Sukhonsky Selsoviet of Mezhdurechensky District
Semyonovskoye, Ust-Kubinsky District, Vologda Oblast, a village in Mitensky Selsoviet of Ust-Kubinsky District
Semyonovskoye, Novlensky Selsoviet, Vologodsky District, Vologda Oblast, a village in Novlensky Selsoviet of Vologodsky District
Semyonovskoye, Podlesny Selsoviet, Vologodsky District, Vologda Oblast, a village in Podlesny Selsoviet of Vologodsky District
Semyonovskaya, Babayevsky District, Vologda Oblast, a village in Novolukinsky Selsoviet of Babayevsky District
Semyonovskaya, Baranovsky Selsoviet, Kaduysky District, Vologda Oblast, a village in Baranovsky Selsoviet of Kaduysky District
Semyonovskaya, Nikolsky Selsoviet, Kaduysky District, Vologda Oblast, a village in Nikolsky Selsoviet of Kaduysky District
Semyonovskaya, Azletsky Selsoviet, Kharovsky District, Vologda Oblast, a village in Azletsky Selsoviet of Kharovsky District
Semyonovskaya, Kumzersky Selsoviet, Kharovsky District, Vologda Oblast, a village in Kumzersky Selsoviet of Kharovsky District
Semyonovskaya, Shevnitsky Selsoviet, Kharovsky District, Vologda Oblast, a village in Shevnitsky Selsoviet of Kharovsky District
Semyonovskaya, Slobodskoy Selsoviet, Kharovsky District, Vologda Oblast, a village in Slobodskoy Selsoviet of Kharovsky District
Semyonovskaya, Kirillovsky District, Vologda Oblast, a village in Pechengsky Selsoviet of Kirillovsky District
Semyonovskaya, Tarnogsky District, Vologda Oblast, a village in Zaborsky Selsoviet of Tarnogsky District
Semyonovskaya, Totemsky District, Vologda Oblast, a village in Vozhbalsky Selsoviet of Totemsky District
Semyonovskaya, Ivanovsky Selsoviet, Vashkinsky District, Vologda Oblast, a village in Ivanovsky Selsoviet of Vashkinsky District
Semyonovskaya, Porechensky Selsoviet, Vashkinsky District, Vologda Oblast, a village in Porechensky Selsoviet of Vashkinsky District
Semyonovskaya, Verkhovazhsky District, Vologda Oblast, a village in Lipetsky Selsoviet of Verkhovazhsky District
Semyonovskaya, Beketovsky Selsoviet, Vozhegodsky District, Vologda Oblast, a village in Beketovsky Selsoviet of Vozhegodsky District
Semyonovskaya, Maryinsky Selsoviet, Vozhegodsky District, Vologda Oblast, a village in Maryinsky Selsoviet of Vozhegodsky District
Semyonovskaya, Vytegorsky District, Vologda Oblast, a village in Semyonovsky Selsoviet of Vytegorsky District

Voronezh Oblast
As of 2010, one rural locality in Voronezh Oblast bears this name:
Semyonovsky, Voronezh Oblast, a settlement in Buravtsovskoye Rural Settlement of Ertilsky District

Yaroslavl Oblast
As of 2010, eleven rural localities in Yaroslavl Oblast bear this name:
Semyonovskoye, Borisoglebsky District, Yaroslavl Oblast, a selo in Voshchazhnikovsky Rural Okrug of Borisoglebsky District
Semyonovskoye, Breytovsky District, Yaroslavl Oblast, a selo in Pokrovo-Sitsky Rural Okrug of Breytovsky District
Semyonovskoye, Danilovsky District, Yaroslavl Oblast, a village in Trofimovsky Rural Okrug of Danilovsky District
Semyonovskoye, Nekrasovsky District, Yaroslavl Oblast, a village in Nikolsky Rural Okrug of Nekrasovsky District
Semyonovskoye, Pervomaysky District, Yaroslavl Oblast, a selo in Semyonovsky Rural Okrug of Pervomaysky District
Semyonovskoye, Rostovsky District, Yaroslavl Oblast, a village in Novo-Nikolsky Rural Okrug of Rostovsky District
Semyonovskoye, Rybinsky District, Yaroslavl Oblast, a selo in Volzhsky Rural Okrug of Rybinsky District
Semyonovskoye, Kurbsky Rural Okrug, Yaroslavsky District, Yaroslavl Oblast, a village in Kurbsky Rural Okrug of Yaroslavsky District
Semyonovskoye, Levtsovsky Rural Okrug, Yaroslavsky District, Yaroslavl Oblast, a village in Levtsovsky Rural Okrug of Yaroslavsky District
Semyonovskoye, Lyutovsky Rural Okrug, Yaroslavsky District, Yaroslavl Oblast, a village in Lyutovsky Rural Okrug of Yaroslavsky District
Semyonovskoye, Mordvinovsky Rural Okrug, Yaroslavsky District, Yaroslavl Oblast, a village in Mordvinovsky Rural Okrug of Yaroslavsky District